Samir & Viktor or Samir och Viktor was a Swedish music duo that consists of Paradise Hotel contestant Samir Badran and fashion blogger Viktor Frisk. Samir & Viktor participated in Melodifestivalen 2015 with the song "Groupie", which finished eighth in the final, and again in Melodifestivalen 2016 with "Bada Nakna" which placed 12th overall. They competed a third time in Melodifestivalen 2018 with "Shuffla", finishing in 4th place in the grand final.

Career

2014: Debut single

In May 2014 the duo released their first music single called "Success". The song peaked at number one in its first week on the Swedish iTunes chart. It also reached number three on the Swedish Singles Chart.

2015–present: Melodifestivalen

Samir & Viktor participated in Melodifestivalen 2015 with the song "Groupie" in a bid to represent Sweden in the Eurovision Song Contest 2015 in Vienna, Austria. They performed on 14 February 2015 in the second semi-final round finishing 3rd moving to the "Second Chance" round on 7 March 2015 where they confronted Behrang Miri feat. Victor Crone in "Det rår vi inte för". Winning the round with a big margin, they qualified to the finals in Stockholm held on 14 March finishing eighth overall. "Groupie" proved very successful commercially reaching number three on Sverigetopplistan, the official Swedish Singles Chart. The duo's follow-up single was "Saxofuckingfon", the song peaked at number two on the Swedish Singles Chart. 

They took part in Melodifestivalen 2016 with the song "Bada nakna". They qualified to andra chansen through the first semi-final on 6 February 2016. They qualified to the final through andra chasen, but they ended up placing last. Their follow-up single "Fick Feeling" was digitally released on 25 May 2016. After that, the group announced they would be taking a hiatus to pursue solo endeavours. They released their comeback single "Kung" on 12 May 2017.

They participated in Melodifestivalen 2018 with "Shuffla", finishing in 4th place in the grand final, their best placing in Melodifestivalen yet.

Discography

Singles

References

Swedish pop music groups
Swedish-language singers
Swedish musical duos
Melodifestivalen contestants of 2018
Melodifestivalen contestants of 2016
Melodifestivalen contestants of 2015